The 6th NACAC Under-23 Championships in Athletics were held in
Miramar, Florida, United States, at the Ansin Sports Complex on July 9–11, 2010.  A detailed report on the results was given.

Medal summary

Detailed results can be found on the Athletics Canada
website, on the  Half-Mile Timing
website, and on the Tilastopaja
website.

Men

Women

Medal table
The medal count has been published.

Participation (unofficial)
A preliminary list of participating countries as of May 21, 2010, was published. According to an unofficial count, 257 athletes from 21 countries participated.   

 (4)
 (3)
 (23)
 (6)
 (2)
 (2)
 (29)
 (4)
 (4)
 (15)
 (22)
 México (29)
 (4)
 (1)
 (8)
 (5)
 (2)
 (1)
 (14)
 (1)
 (78)

References

2010
2010 in American sports
NACAC U23
International track and field competitions hosted by the United States
Miramar, Florida
2010 in sports in Florida
International sports competitions in Florida
Track and field in Florida
2010 in youth sport